The Renewable Energy Programme (REP) is Nigeria's contribution to the African strategy on voluntary emission reduction in response to United Nations Framework Convention on Climate Change (UNFCC) The Federal Ministry of Environment's Renewable Energy Programme is targeted at stimulating the energy sector by attracting capital as well as promoting the development of initiatives and technologies in Nigeria.

Mission 
 Create awareness about Nigeria's challenges of clean energy supply
 Develop and commercialize the Renewable energy sector 
 Provide avenues for private sector participation
 Influence government policy on alternative sources of energy that are clean, reliable, stable and sustainable

Goals 
 Stable electricity supply
 Protection of the environment
 Reduction of Green house gas emissions
 Enhance Biofuels production through agricultural and household waste
 Convert rural cooking methods from firewood and fossil fuel to smokeless alternatives
 Address pollution, deforestation and vegetation loss
 Position Nigeria as a role model in Africa's contribution to the climate change commitments
 Job and wealth creation

Projects 
In order for the programme to achieve its goals, such as mitigating the impacts of climate change, the following projects have been proposed:

See also

References

External links 
REP Facebook Page

Renewable energy in Nigeria